S. Haunani Apoliona is a native Hawaiian banker and activist for the Hawaiian sovereignty movement.

Apoliona was elected to the Office of Hawaiian Affairs Board of Trustees and became its chairperson.  She held federal offices, appointed to the President of the United States Advisory Commission on Asian American and Pacific Islanders and the United States Census Bureau Race Ethnic Advisory Council.  As a businesswoman, she was a trustee with the Bank of Hawaii starting in 2004.

Hawaii residents also know her as an entertainer and performer with the Hawaiian music group Olomana.

References

External links
S. Haunani Apoliona Site

Native Hawaiian nationalists
Native Hawaiian politicians
Living people
Year of birth missing (living people)